Khurshid Khan was a renowned musician and sitarist of Bangladesh. He was awarded the Independence Day Award in 2000 for his unique contribution to the pursuit of music.

Early life 
Khan was born on 1 January 1935 in Sadakpur,  Nabinagar Upazila, Brahmanbaria District, East Bengali, British India. His family, the Khan's of Brahmanbaria, are a family of well known musicians. His mother, Ambia Khanam, was the daughter of Ayet Ali Khan and his uncle was Allauddin Khan. He trained under his uncles, Abed Hossain Khan and Bahadur Khan.

Career 
Khan worked at the State Radio as a sarod player from 1961 to 1964; and then joined the National Television Network (present Bangladesh Television). He was a music jury member at the University of Dhaka.

Awards 
Khan was awarded the Independence Day Award, the highest civilian honour, in 2000 for outstanding contributions to music practice.

Death 
Khan died on 20 January 2012.

References 

Recipients of the Independence Day Award
1935 births
2012 deaths
People from Brahmanbaria district
Sitar players
Bangladeshi musicians